The flag of the United States Navy consists of the seal of the U.S. Department of the Navy in the center, above a yellow scroll inscribed "United States Navy" in dark blue letters, against a dark blue background.

The flag was officially authorized by President Dwight D. Eisenhower on 24 April 1959 and was formally introduced to the public on 30 April 1959 at a ceremony at Naval Support Facility Carderock in Maryland. It replaced the infantry battalion flag which had been used as the U.S. Navy's unofficial flag for many years beforehand.

It is used on land, displayed inside naval offices, in parades, and for other ceremonial occasions, and often on a staff at the quarterdeck of ships in port. It is not flown by ships at sea, nor on outdoor flagpoles on naval land installations, and is not used as an identifying mark of U.S. Navy ships and facilities, as the U.S. Coast Guard ensign is.

Executive order

The following is details from the Naval Telecommunications Procedures, Flags, Pennants & Customs, NTP 13(B)

1710. FLAG OF THE UNITED STATES NAVY
By Executive Order 10812 of 24 April 1959, the President, upon the recommendation of the Secretary of the Navy with the approval of the Secretary of Defense, established and prescribed an official flag for the United States Navy. This flag is to be 4 feet 4 inches hoist (width) by 5 feet 6 inches fly (length), of dark blue material, with yellow fringe, 2½ inches wide. In the center of the flag is a device 3 feet 1 inch overall, consisting of the inner pictorial portion of the seal of the Department of the Navy (with the exception that a continuation of the sea has been substituted for the land area), in its proper colors within a circular yellow rope edging, all 2 feet 6 inches in diameter above a yellow scroll inscribed "UNITED STATES NAVY" in dark blue letters.

Streamers
The following streamers are authorized, in order of precedence:

 Note that a "x #" designation denotes the number of streamers used to carry devices (maximum of 6), not the number of awards. For streamers there the device column lists "red numerals", the total number of the award earned by ships and units of the Navy are totalled and embroidered in red. Because these numbers are constantly changing, they are not listed here.

Navy jack 

Jacks are additional national flags flown by warships (and certain other ships) on a jackstaff at the bow of the ship. These are usually flown only when not underway and when the ship is dressed on special occasions.

See also 
 Flags of the United States Armed Forces

References

External links

 The U.S. Navy's First Jack
 
 First Sailor to Carry Flag Returns

United States Navy
Navy
United States Navy traditions
Naval flags
Flags displaying animals